Anita Auglend (born 24 January 1979), is a Norwegian singer who was the lead vocalist of the gothic-doom metal band The Sins of Thy Beloved. She has a soprano vocal range.

The Sins of Thy Beloved

After the albums Lake of Sorrow (1998) and Perpetual Desolation (2000), she left the band in 2001 along with their keyboardists Anders Thue and Ingfrid Stensland because of the travelling required of the band. She was later rumored to have returned to the band in 2007, although this has never been confirmed.

Discography

With The Sins of Thy Beloved 
 Lake of Sorrow - 1998
 Perpetual Desolation - 2000
 Perpetual Desolation Live - 2001
 Perpetual Desolation Live in México

EPs 
 All Alone - 1998
 Silent Pain - 1997

External links 
 The Sins of Thy Beloved page at the BNR Metal Pages
 The Sins of Thy Beloved page at the Encyclopaedia Metallum

1979 births
Women heavy metal singers
Living people
Norwegian heavy metal singers
Norwegian sopranos
21st-century Norwegian singers
21st-century Norwegian women singers